Charles A. Denny (17 March 1886 – 8 January 1971) was a British cyclist who set multiple local, national and world records. He won a silver medal in the 100km event at the 1908 Summer Olympics.

See also 
 Arthur J. Denny

References

External links
 
 Arthur Denny (silver medal: 100km men) at the International Olympic Committee
 London 1908 / Cycling Track / 100km men (silver medal: Arthur Denny) at the International Olympic Committee

1886 births
1971 deaths
British male cyclists
Olympic cyclists of Great Britain
Cyclists at the 1908 Summer Olympics
Olympic silver medallists for Great Britain
Olympic medalists in cycling
Place of birth missing
Medalists at the 1908 Summer Olympics
20th-century British people